The Texas and New Orleans Railroad was a railroad in Texas and Louisiana. It operated  of railroad in 1934; by 1961,  remained when it merged with parent company Southern Pacific.

Location 
The Morgan's Louisiana and Texas Railroad was a partly double-track, standard-gauge, steam railroad, situated entirely within the State of Louisiana. The main line extended from Algiers, on the Mississippi River opposite New Orleans, to Lafayette, where it connected with the line of the Louisiana Western Railroad Company. It formed an important link in the through route of the Southern Pacific Company between New Orleans and San Francisco. The principal branch lines extended from Lafayette to the Mississippi River opposite Baton Rouge, from Lafayette to Cheneyville, from Breaux Bridge to Port Barre, from Breaux Bridge to Cade, and from Thibodaux Junction to Napoleonville. There were a number of other branch lines of an average length of about 10 miles, which served the numerous sugar plantations along parts of the line.

History

Early history 1856–1880 

The Texas and New Orleans Railroad was chartered as the Sabine and Galveston Bay Railroad and Lumber Company in 1856, and was formed to build a railroad from Madison (now Orange) in Orange County to tidewater at Galveston Bay. Groundbreaking was on August 27, 1857 outside Houston and real construction work began in April, 1858. Shortly thereafter some work was transferred to Beaumont and railroad construction went east and west. By this time many people started to figure out the builders of the railroad wanted to see a railroad connecting Houston with New Orleans.

In the following year rails and equipment were ordered and received. In late 1859 the name of the railroad was changed to the Texas and New Orleans Railroad Company.

In spring 1862 the President of the Railway, Abram M. Gentry, stated that the  line from Houston to Orange was open, but some of the track was temporary for military needs due to the Civil War. Scheduled service was operated from Houston to Orange from 1862 to mid-1863 and irregular service until early 1864. Work on the line to Louisiana continued until New Orleans was captured.

The Trinity River Bridge washed out in 1867 and the Texas and New Orleans continued to offer service between Houston and Beaumont until spring 1868, at which time the company was forced into receivership. From 1870 to 1871 limited service operated between Houston and West Liberty until the railroad was sold. The purchaser was John F. Terry of the New York banking firm of J. S. Kennedy and Company. A new Texas and New Orleans Railroad company was chartered in 1874 and Terry was named president.

The first train from Houston to Orange in over a decade ran in late 1876. In 1878 the Texas and New Orleans, Charles Morgan's Louisiana and Texas Railroad and Steamship Company, and the Louisiana Western Railroad Company reached an agreement and the line was finished from Orange to New Orleans. The Louisiana Western Extension Railroad Company was chartered in Texas to build from Orange to the Louisiana boundary and the first through train ran from Houston to New Orleans on August 30, 1880.

Expansion 1881–1920 

In 1881 C. P. Huntington, acting for the Southern Pacific Railroad Company, bought the Texas and New Orleans as well as many other railroads in the southern United States. As a result of this acquiring of railroads by Southern Pacific, The Texas and New Orleans Railroad found itself as part of a major transcontinental route. In 1882, The T&NO made over $1,500,000 and owned 36 locomotives as well as over 1000 pieces of rolling stock. Also in 1882 the T&NO acquired the  Sabine and East Texas Railway Company. Many more companies were merged into T&NO from 1880 to 1900. In 1921, the Texas State Railroad was leased in.

1921–1961 

At the end of 1925 T&NO operated 545 miles of railroad; to simplify SP's corporate holdings T&NO leased the other Texas-Louisiana SP lines in 1927, including:

Dayton-Goose Creek Railway Company
Franklin and Abbeville Railway
Galveston, Harrisburg and San Antonio Railway
Houston and Shreveport Railroad
Houston and Texas Central Railway
Houston East and West Texas Railway
Iberia and Vermilion Railroad
Lake Charles and Northern Railroad
Louisiana Western Railroad 
Morgan's Louisiana and Texas Railroad and Steamship Co
San Antonio and Aransas Pass Railway
Texas Midland Railroad

On November 1, 1961 the remaining  merged into the Southern Pacific and the T&NO ceased to exist.

Named trains

Named passenger trains operated on T&NO rails included:

Sunset Limited (New Orleans to Los Angeles)
Argonaut (New Orleans to Los Angeles)
Sunbeam (Houston to Dallas)
Hustler (Houston to Dallas)
Owl (Houston to Dallas)
Border Limited (Houston to Brownsville)
Rabbit (Houston to Shreveport)
Alamo (San Antonio to New Orleans)

References

Defunct Louisiana railroads
Defunct Texas railroads
Predecessors of the Southern Pacific Transportation Company
Former Class I railroads in the United States
Railway companies established in 1859
Railway companies disestablished in 1961
5 ft 6 in gauge railways in the United States
1859 establishments in Texas
American companies established in 1859
American companies disestablished in 1961